Tricholita knudsoni is a moth of the family Noctuidae. It is known from western Texas from Concan westward to the Chisos, Davis, and Guadalupe Mountains.

All known specimens were collected at light between late August and late October.

References

Moths described in 2009
Hadeninae